Frode Søby (born 16 April 1935), is a Danish chess player.

Chess career
In the 1960s Frode Søby was one of the leading Danish chess players. He participated in the finals of Danish Chess Championships and reached her best result in 1962, when he ranked in 7th place.

Frode Søby played for Denmark in the Chess Olympiad: 
 In 1962, at fourth board in the 15th Chess Olympiad in Varna (+4, =3, -8).

Since the mid-1970s Frode Søby rarely plays in serious chess tournaments. Since the early 1990s he played mainly in Danish chess team competitions.

References

External links

Frode Søby chess games at 365chess.com

1935 births
Living people
Danish chess players
Chess Olympiad competitors
20th-century chess players